Ultan O'Callaghan (born 24 March 1971) is an Irish former rugby union player.

Career
Born in Cork, O'Callaghan represented local club Cork Constitution throughout the 1990s in the All-Ireland League. He missed Con's victorious final against Garryowen in 1999 due to injury, and was captain of the team that ended up losing to Dungannon during the 2000–01 season, though O'Callaghan himself again missed the final due to injury. He also won representation with the Ireland under-21 team and five caps for Munster between 1996 and 1998, before playing for Connacht in 1999.

After the end of his brief professional playing career, O'Callaghan returned to Munster as a development officer in 2000, going on to become coach development manager, before being domestic rugby manager in 2008.

References

External links
Munster Profile

Living people
1971 births
Rugby union players from Cork (city)
Irish rugby union players
Cork Constitution players
Munster Rugby players
Connacht Rugby players
Rugby union locks